NNHS may refer to:
 Newport News High School, Newport News, Virginia, United States
 Naperville North High School, Naperville, Illinois, United States
 Navotas National High School, Navotas, Philippines
 Newton North High School, Newton, Massachusetts, United States
 Niles North High School, Skokie, Illinois, United States
 Northern Nash High School, Rocky Mount, North Carolina, United States